All Together Now (also known with local varying titles in some countries broadcasting the format) is a reality television singing competition format.

History
The format began in 2018 with the British television series on BBC One; its first adaptation was the Brazilian series known as Canta Comigo followed by Danish and Australian editions under the title All Together Now and a Polish edition Śpiewajmy razem. All Together Now.

Many other countries have scheduled local editions including Colombia (A otro Nivel: Canta Conmigo), France (Together, tous avec moi), Germany (Sing Mit Mir), Italy (All Together Now), Netherlands (All Together Now), Romania (Cântă acum cu mine), Russia (Ну-ка, все вместе) and Portugal (All Together Now). In 2021, Malaysia has taken the steps to release their local edition as well called "All Together Now Malaysia" which is the first country in Asia to adapt the series.

Format
In each episode, a range of singers take to the stage, but waiting to judge each performance is 'The 100' – a unique panel of one hundred music experts and performers from across the country. The initial UK edition was hosted by Spice Girl, Geri Horner, and the first UK series consisted of six episodes: five heats and the final.

The heats
During each heat, performers try and outscore their competitors in order to earn a seat on the top three podium. Whenever a performer scores high enough for a podium place, the act in 3rd place is eliminated as a result.

From each heat, two acts go through to the series final. Once all acts have sung, the 1st placed performer with the highest score automatically goes through. The acts in 2nd and 3rd sing off against one another and the winner of that sing off earns the second qualification spot.

Prior to filming, all performers choose the song they want to sing. The 100 learn the words to all the songs before the show, but they don't know who is going to come out and sing said songs to them. Each song is approximately 90 seconds long, but importantly the 100 can only join in for the final 60 seconds as signified by a lighting change. This means that the 100 have the same amount of time to join in the singing for every act.

Tie-breaks
In the event of a tied score, the 100 review the full performances of both acts on monitors in studio. Each member of the 100 decides which act they prefer and votes by pressing their button. The act with the most votes takes their seat on the podium, meaning that the act with the fewer votes either drops down a podium place or exits the competition. In the event that the tiebreak vote is also tied, the host, as captain of the 100 has the casting vote.

The sing-off
For the sing-off at the end of the show, scores are reset to zero and the 2nd and 3rd placed acts perform a new song chosen from a given shortlist. In the event that both acts wish to sing the same song from that shortlist, the performer in 2nd place has priority.

The final and the prize
In the final, the ten finalists (the first placed performer and sing-off winner from each heat) perform again in front of The 100 with a new song. This time, all three acts who finish in the top three podium seats sing again and the act with the highest score after this final sing off wins the series and with it a cash prize.

International versions
 Franchise with a currently airing season
 Franchise awaiting confirmation
 Franchise with an upcoming season
 Franchise with an unknown status
 Franchise that was cancelled during development
 Franchise no longer in production
 Franchise on hold

Notes

References

 
Banijay franchises
Television franchises